Huai'an is a prefecture-level city in Jiangsu, China.

Huai'an may also refer to:

Huai'an District, in Huai'an, Jiangsu, China
Huai'an County, in Zhangjiakou, Hebei, China

See also
Hui'an County, Fujian, China